Évelyne Imbert (born 17 August 1958) is a French rower. She competed in the women's quadruple sculls event at the 1984 Summer Olympics.

References

External links
 

1958 births
Living people
French female rowers
Olympic rowers of France
Rowers at the 1984 Summer Olympics
Place of birth missing (living people)